Route 205 or Highway 205 may refer to:

Canada
 Manitoba Provincial Road 205
 New Brunswick Route 205
 Newfoundland and Labrador Route 205
 Nova Scotia Route 205
 Prince Edward Island Route 205
 Quebec Route 205

China
 China National Highway 205

Costa Rica
 National Route 205

India 
  National Highway 205 (India)

Japan
 Japan National Route 205

Thailand
  Thailand Route 205 (Suranarai Road)

United States
 Interstate 205
 Alabama State Route 205
 Connecticut Route 205
 Florida State Road 205 (former)
 Georgia State Route 205 (former)
 Indiana State Road 205
 Iowa Highway 205 (former)
 K-205 (Kansas highway)
 Kentucky Route 205
 Maine State Route 205
 M-205 (Michigan highway) (former)
 Montana Secondary Highway 205
 New Mexico State Road 205
 New York State Route 205
 North Carolina Highway 205
 Ohio State Route 205
 Oregon Route 205
 Pennsylvania Route 205 (former)
 Tennessee State Route 205
 Texas State Highway 205
 Texas State Highway Loop 205
 Utah State Route 205 (former)
 Virginia State Route 205
Territories
 Puerto Rico Highway 205